The following is a list of flags of Lithuania.

National flag and State flag

Government flags

Military flags

Historical flags

Soviet occupation

County flags
Each county of Lithuania has adopted a flag, each of them conforming to a pattern: a blue rectangle, with ten instances of the Cross of Vytis appearing in gold, acts as a fringe to the central feature of the flag, which is chosen by the county itself. Most of the central designs were adapted from the counties' coat of arms.

See also

 Flag of Lithuania
 Coat of arms of Lithuania

Flags of Lithuania
Flags
Lists and galleries of flags
Flags